Davarabad (also Romanized as Dāvarābād) is a village in Yateri Rural District, in the Central District of Aradan County, Semnan Province, Iran. At the 2006 census, its population was 1,570, in 454 families.

References 

Populated places in Aradan County